Vice Admiral Christopher Angus Ritchie  (born 16 January 1949) is a retired senior officer of the Royal Australian Navy, who served as Chief of Navy from 2002 to 2005.

Early life
Ritchie was born in Melbourne on 16 January 1949 to Angus Lachlan Ritchie and Colleen Burnice Ritchie.

Naval career
Ritchie graduated from the RAN College at Jervis Bay in 1968. He received further training at sea and in the United Kingdom before undertaking a succession of seagoing appointments and a staff appointment at the NATO School of Maritime Operations at HMS DRYAD.

During his period in command of HMAS Brisbane, the ship deployed to the Persian Gulf where she participated for the duration of the Persian Gulf War. In 1991, as a result of this service, he was appointed a Member of the Order of Australia.

In 1992 he attended the Royal College of Defence Studies in the United Kingdom. On completion of this course he was promoted to commodore and had appointments in Naval Policy and Warfare, and Military Strategy and Concepts. In 1997 he was promoted to rear admiral and appointed as Maritime Commander Australia. He then served as Deputy Chief of Navy and Head of Capability Systems.

As a consequence of his service in these appointments, and in addition to receiving the Centenary medal, he was promoted to Officer of the Order of Australia in January 2001. He was promoted to vice admiral and appointed Commander Australian Theatre on 3 August 2001. He was the first Commander to have previously served as a Component Commander to the Headquarters. He assumed command of the Royal Australian Navy from Chief of Navy (CN) Vice Admiral David Shackleton on 3 July 2002 and retired in July 2005.

After military service
In 2018, Vice Admiral Chris Ritchie was reported as a spokesman for Shipbuilder Lurssen Australia who would be building new offshore patrol vessels.

References

External links

Copyright photo of VADM Chris Ritchie, Chief of Navy, ANZAC Day 2005.

1949 births
Military personnel from Melbourne
Graduates of the Royal College of Defence Studies
Australian military personnel of the Gulf War
Australian military personnel of the Vietnam War
Chiefs of Navy (Australia)
Deputy Chiefs of Navy (Australia)
Foreign recipients of the Legion of Merit
Living people
Officers of the Order of Australia
Recipients of the Centenary Medal
Royal Australian Navy admirals
Recipients of the Meritorious Unit Citation